Letizia (born Letizia Ortiz Rocasolano, ; 15 September 1972) is Queen of Spain as the wife of King Felipe VI.

Letizia came from a middle-class family. She worked as a journalist for ABC and EFE before becoming a news anchor at CNN+ and Televisión Española. In 1998, she married Alonso Guerrero Pérez, whom she divorced the following year. In 2004, Letizia married Felipe, then Prince of Asturias as the son and heir of King Juan Carlos I. The couple have two daughters, Leonor and Sofía. As Princess of Asturias, Letizia represented her father-in-law in Spain and abroad. On Juan Carlos's abdication in June 2014, Felipe became king, making Letizia queen consort.

Family
Letizia Ortiz Rocasolano was born on 15 September 1972 at Miñor Sanatorium in Oviedo, Asturias, the eldest daughter of Jesús José Ortiz Álvarez, a journalist, and his first wife, María de la Paloma Rocasolano Rodríguez, a registered nurse and hospital union representative. She has two younger sisters, Telma (b. 1973) and Érika (1975–2007), whose death was widely reported by press as due to an intentional prescription drug overdose.

Letizia's parents divorced in 1999 and her father remarried in Madrid on 18 March 2004 to fellow journalist Ana Togores.

Letizia's paternal grandparents were José Luis Ortiz Velasco (ca. 1923–2005), a commercial employee at Olivetti; and María del Carmen "Menchu" Álvarez del Valle (1928–2021), a radio broadcaster in Asturias for over 40 years. Her maternal grandfather was Francisco Julio Rocasolano Camacho (1918–2015), a mechanic and cab driver in Madrid for over 20 years who was of French and Occitan origin. Letizia's maternal grandmother, Enriqueta Rodriguez Figueredo (1919–2008) was born in the Philippines to Filipino and Spanish parents.

British genealogists have provided evidence that through her mother's Rocasolano lineage, Letizia descends from Astorg Roquesoulane (died c.1564), and her coat of arms incorporates the arms of the Rocasolano family. Reports have suggested – and remain unproven – that on her paternal grandfather's side, Letizia is a descendant of an untitled family descended from medieval nobility who served as constables of Castile.

Education and career
Letizia attended La Gesta School in Oviedo, before her family moved to Rivas-Vaciamadrid near Madrid, where she attended the Ramiro de Maeztu High School. She completed a bachelor's degree in journalism, at the Complutense University of Madrid, as well as a master's degree in audiovisual journalism at the Institute for Studies in Audiovisual Journalism.

During her studies, Letizia worked for the Asturian daily newspaper La Nueva España and later for the newspaper ABC and the news agency EFE. After completing her master's degree, she travelled to Guadalajara, Mexico, where she worked at the newspaper Siglo 21 and began work toward a PhD. She did not, however, complete her doctoral thesis because she returned to Spain. After returning to Spain, she worked for the Spanish version of the economic channel Bloomberg before moving to the news network CNN+.

In 2000, she moved to TVE, where she started working for the news channel 24 Horas. In 2002, she anchored the weekly news report programme Informe Semanal and later the daily morning news programme Telediario Matinal on TVE 1. In August 2003, a few months before her engagement to Felipe, Letizia was promoted to anchor of the TVE daily evening news programme Telediario 2, the most viewed newscast in Spain.
In 2000, Letizia reported from Washington, D.C., on the presidential elections. In September 2001, she broadcast live from Ground Zero following the 9/11 attacks in New York and in 2003, she filed reports from Iraq following the war. In 2002 she sent several reports from Galicia in northern Spain following the ecological disaster when the oil tanker Prestige sank.

First marriage
Letizia married Alonso Guerrero Pérez (born in 1962), a writer and a high school literature teacher, on 7 August 1998, in a simple civil ceremony at Almendralejo, in Badajoz, after a 10-year courtship. The marriage was dissolved by divorce in 1999.

Second marriage and children

On 1 November 2003, to the surprise of many, the Royal Household announced Letizia's engagement to Felipe, then Prince of Asturias. Afterwards, she moved to live in a wing of the Zarzuela Palace until the day of her wedding. The Prince of Asturias had proposed to her with a 16-baguette diamond engagement ring with a white gold trim. She marked the occasion by giving him white gold and sapphire
cufflinks and a classic book.

The wedding took place on 22 May 2004 in the Cathedral Santa María la Real de la Almudena in Madrid. It was the first royal wedding in this cathedral. It had been nearly a century since the capital celebrated a royal wedding, as the prince's parents married in Athens, and his sisters, Infanta Elena and Infanta Cristina, married in Seville and Barcelona respectively.
Letizia's bridal gown was designed by Spanish fashion designer Manuel Pertegaz, her bridal shoes by Pura López; and the veil, a gift from Felipe to his bride, was made of off-white silk tulle and hand-embroidered with detailing.
As Letizia's previous marriage involved only a civil ceremony, the Catholic Church does not consider it canonically valid and therefore did not require an annulment to proceed with a Catholic marriage to the Prince of Asturias.

Letizia and Felipe have two daughters: Leonor, Princess of Asturias, born on 31 October 2005; and Infanta Sofía, born on 29 April 2007. They were born at Ruber International Hospital in Madrid.

Princess of Asturias

Princess Letizia immediately joined in the duties of her husband and travelled extensively through Spain representing her father-in-law. They also represented Spain in other countries: she has travelled along with her husband to Jordan, Mexico, Peru, Hungary, the Dominican Republic, Panama, the United States, Serbia, Brazil, Uruguay, Sweden, Denmark, Japan, China, and Portugal. She also greeted international dignitaries, along with other members of the royal family, and attended gatherings of foreign royalty in Luxembourg, for the silver wedding anniversary of the Grand Duke and Grand Duchess of Luxembourg, and in the Netherlands for the 40th birthday of the Prince of Orange.

Her solo agenda was announced in 2006, shortly after the announcement of her second pregnancy. Letizia has performed a couple of audiences and her work focuses on social issues such as children's rights, culture, and education. In late 2007, her solo agenda started to grow in the number of events she performed by herself and Felipe's and Letizia's agendas became more distinct and separate.

Queen of Spain 

On 19 June 2014, Letizia became Queen of Spain; as such, she holds the style of Majesty. She is the first Spanish-born queen consort since Mercedes of Orléans, the first wife of Alfonso XII, in 1878. She is also the first Spanish queen to have been born as a commoner.
Queen Letizia undertook her first solo engagement as queen on 23 June 2014 at the inauguration of the El Greco and modern painting exhibition at the National Prado museum in Madrid.

In their first overseas trip as king and queen, Felipe VI and Letizia met Pope Francis on 30 June 2014, in the Apostolic Palace.  They later met with Cardinal Secretary of State Pietro Parolin, accompanied by Mgsr. Antoine Camilleri, under-secretary for Relations with States.  The visit followed one by King Juan Carlos I and Queen Sofia on 28 April. In 2015, Letizia was named Special Ambassador for Nutrition for the United Nations Food and Agriculture Organization.

In March 2016, leaked text messages between Letizia and businessman Javier López Madrid created a controversy.  Together with other executives and board members of the Caja Madrid and Bankia financial group, Madrid had been accused of corruption.  In October 2014 Letizia pledged her support for him, texting "We know who you are and you know who we are.  We know each other, like each other, respect each other.  To hell with the rest.  Kisses yoga mate (miss you!!!)".  Felipe also joined in, texting "We do indeed!"  The newspaper El Diario later published these texts.  A palace official subsequently stated that the King and Queen were no longer friends with López Madrid due to his legal issues.

For the 2020 Rey Jaime I Awards in Valencia, Queen Letizia presented the award-winners with their gold medals and gave a short speech praising the "talent, effort and generosity" (el talento, el esfuerzo y la generosidad) of prize-winners.

Titles and honours 

On 21 May 2004, the day before her marriage to Prince Felipe, Letizia was appointed a Dame Grand Cross of the Royal and Distinguished Order of Charles III. Since then, Letizia has received different appointments and decorations by foreign states and other Spanish honours.

Letizia was styled as "Her Royal Highness The Princess of Asturias" from her marriage to her husband's accession in 2014, and as "Her Majesty The Queen" since.

Arms
The coat of arms of Queen Letizia was adopted in 2014, based on the design created for her by the Asturian Academy of Heraldry and Genealogy (Academia Asturiana de Heráldica y Genealogía) in May 2004 and approved by Vicente de Cadenas y Vicent, Cronista Rey de Armas; this was used by her as Princess of Asturias. The revision of 2014 was confirmed by Don Alfonso Ceballos-Escalera y Gil, Chronicler of Arms for Castile and León. 

The Queen's coat of arms has no governmental status, as in Spain only those of the King and those of the Princess of Asturias are so recognized.

References

External links 

 Official website of the Spanish Monarchy

|-

1972 births
Living people
People from Oviedo
House of Bourbon (Spain)
Spanish monarchy
Spanish royal consorts
Spanish television presenters
Spanish journalists
Spanish women television presenters
Spanish women journalists
Princesses of Asturias
Princesses of Viana
Complutense University of Madrid alumni
Articles containing video clips
Felipe VI of Spain
Princesses by marriage